Bianca is a given name.

Bianca may also refer to:

Bodies in outer space
Bianca (moon), one of the moons of Uranus
218 Bianca, an asteroid

Arts and entertainment
Bianca (1984 film), by Italian director Nanni Moretti
Bianca (1913 film), a silent film starring Patricia Palmer
Bianca (opera), a 1918 one-act opera by Henry Kimball Hadley
Bianca – Wege zum Glück, the first German telenovela

People with the surname
Sondra Bianca (born 1930), American concert pianist
Stefano Bianca, Swiss architectural historian and urban designer
Viva Bianca (born 1983), Australian actress

Other uses
bianca.com, the first web-based chat room
Bianca (grape), a Hungarian wine grape

See also
Bianca 27, a Danish built sailboat
Bianco, a resort town in Italy
MV Bianca C., a passenger ship built in 1944 that sank twice
Sol Bianca, an anime OVA series